Rosso is a surname of Italian origin, which means "red (haired)".

Geographical distribution
As of 2014, 45.5% of all known bearers of the surname Rosso were residents of Italy (frequency 1:2,279), 13.4% of Argentina (1:5,407), 9.7% of Brazil (1:35,898), 6.8% of the United States (1:89,908), 6.0% of France (1:18,766), 4.9% of the Dominican Republic (1:3,613), 2.9% of Colombia (1:27,711), 1.7% of Bolivia (1:10,735), 1.4% of Uruguay (1:4,175) and 1.1% of Spain (1:73,139).

In Italy, the frequency of the surname was higher than national average (1:2,279) in the following regions:
 1. Piedmont (1:253)
 2. Liguria (1:881)
 3. Friuli-Venezia Giulia (1:884)
 4. Veneto (1:2,032)

In Uruguay, the frequency of the surname was higher than national average (1:4,175) in the following departments:
 1. Soriano (1:654)
 2. Florida (1:1,228)
 3. Canelones (1:2,608)
 4. Río Negro (1:2,716)

In Argentina, the frequency of the surname was higher than national average (1:5,407) in the following provinces:
 1. Córdoba Province (1:1,667)
 2. Santa Fe Province (1:1,733)
 3. San Luis Province (1:2,332)
 4. La Pampa Province (1:2,962)
 5. Formosa Province (1:3,927)

People
 Antonio De Rosso (born 1941), head of the Orthodox Church in Italy and the Metropolitan of Ravenna and Italy
 Camilla and Rebecca Rosso (born 1994), British former actresses and singers
 Franco Rosso (1941–2016), Italian-born film producer and director
 Frank Rosso (1921–1980), American baseball player
 George Rosso (1930–1994), American professional football player
 Giovanni Rosso (born 1972), Croatian professional football player
 Julee Rosso (contemporary), American cook and food writer
 Medardo Rosso (1858–1928), Italian sculptor
 Nini Rosso (1926–1994), Italian jazz trumpeter and composer
 Patrick Rosso (born 1969), French judoka
 Ramón Rosso (born 1996), Dominican Republic professional baseball player
 Renzo Rosso (born 1955), Italian clothing designer; co-founder of the Diesel clothing company
 Rebecca Rosso (born 1994), British actress, twin sister of Camilla Rosso, and younger sister of Georgina Rosso
 Stefano Rosso (1948–2008), Italian songwriter and guitarist

See also
 Rossi (surname)
 Russo
 Merrick and Rosso, an Australian comedy duo, Merrick Watts and Tim Ross

References

Italian-language surnames
Surnames of Italian origin
Surnames from nicknames